Albanchez is a municipality of Almería province, in Spain.

Demographics

References

External links
  Albanchez Information - Tourist information for the town of Albanchez
  Albánchez - Diputación Provincial de Almería
 Search Almeria Information and business directory for Almeria in English & Spanish

Municipalities in the Province of Almería